John Petrucelli (born October 27, 1992) is an American-Italian professional basketball player for Brescia Leonessa of the Italian Lega Basket Serie A (LBA) and EuroCup Basketball. He played college basketball for Molloy College before playing professionally in Slovakia, the NBA G League and Israel.

Early life and college career
Petrucelli attended Hicksville High School in Hicksville, New York, where he earned All-County Accolades in 2009-10. Petrucelli was also named to the All-Conference Team as a junior.

Petrucelli played college basketball at Molloy College, where he averaged 23 points, 7.6 rebounds, 3 assists and 3.6 steals per game in his senior year, leading the Lions to the conference semi-finals round of the playoffs. On March 4, 2014, Petrucelli was named East Coast Conference Player of the Year.

On January 16, 2020, Petrucelli was inducted into Molloy's Athletic Hall of Fame.

Professional career

Iskra Svit (2015–2016)
On November 1, 2014, Petrucelli was selected in Round 8 with Pick 3 in the 2014 NBA Development League Draft by the Bakersfield Jam. On January 29, 2015, Petrucelli started his professional career with Iskra Svit of the Slovak Basketball League. On November 7, 2015, Petrucelli recorded a career-high 27 points, while shooting 11-of-16 from the field, along with five rebounds, seven assists and three steals in an 81–64 win over Karlovka Bratislava. In 21 games played during the 2015–16 season, he averaged 16.4 points, 5.1 rebounds, 2.6 assists and 1.9 steals per game.

Erie BayHawks / Lakeland Magic (2016–2019)
On June 6, 2016, Petrucelli was acquired by the Erie BayHawks, the NBA D-League affiliate of the Orlando Magic.

On October 10, 2018, Petrucelli signed with the Orlando Magic, but he was waived two days later after training camp. In 47 games played for the Lakeland Magic during the 2018–19 season, he averaged 12.1 points, 4.1 rebounds, 2.6 assists and 1.7 steals per game, while shooting 45.2 percent from three-point range.

On June 25, 2019, Petrucelli joined the Orlando Magic for the 2019 NBA Summer League.

Hapoel Be'er Sheva (2019–2020)
On July 16, 2019, Petrucelli signed a one-year deal with Hapoel Be'er Sheva of the Israeli Premier League. Petrucelli averaged 13 points, 3.9 rebounds, 2.5 assists and 2.5 steals per game.

Ratiopharm Ulm (2020–2021)
On August 3, 2020, Petrucelli signed with ratiopharm Ulm of the German Basketball Bundesliga.

Brescia Leonessa (2021–present)
On July 16, 2021, Petrucelli signed in Italy for Brescia Leonessa of the Italian Lega Basket Serie A (LBA) and EuroCup Basketball.

References

External links
 Molloy Lions bio
 RealGM profile

1992 births
Living people
American expatriate basketball people in Germany
American expatriate basketball people in Israel
American expatriate basketball people in Slovakia
American men's basketball players
BK Iskra Svit players
Erie BayHawks (2008–2017) players
Hapoel Be'er Sheva B.C. players
Lakeland Magic players
Molloy Lions men's basketball players
People from Hicksville, New York
ratiopharm Ulm players
Shooting guards
Sportspeople from Nassau County, New York